is a 2014 Japanese film based on the 
manga series of the same name, and serves as the second installment of the Rurouni Kenshin film series', following the first film Rurouni Kenshin (2012). The film was followed by a direct sequel, Rurouni Kenshin: The Legend Ends, which takes place immediately from the ending of Kyoto Inferno.

On June 21, 2016, Funimation announced that they acquired the rights to the Rurouni Kenshin live-action trilogy for US distribution. Kyoto Inferno was released subtitled in US theaters in September 2016. A home video and video on demand release followed shortly after.

Plot
In Settsu Mine, Hyōgo Prefecture, Saitō Hajime leads the Japanese police in tracking Shishio Makoto, a notorious renegade who was betrayed by the government after he had helped them defeat the Tokugawa shogunate during the Battle of Toba–Fushimi. However, Shishio's men ambush and massacre the police in the mine; Sishio tells Saitō his plan to conquer Japan before leaving.

After the events of the first film, Himura Kenshin continues to live in the kenjutsu dojo of Kamiya Kaoru alongside Myōjin Yahiko, Sagara Sanosuke, and Takani Megumi. He is called by a government official, Ōkubo Toshimichi, to track down Shishio, who is terrorizing Kyoto and its surroundings. Though he declines the request at first, he relents when the official is murdered by Seta Sōjirō, Shishio's underling. Just after Kenshin's departure, an individual arrives at Tokyo and searches for him, beating Sanosuke along the way.

While on the way, Kenshin meets with Makimachi Misao, who attempts to steal his sakabato. While the two converse, they are alerted by a boy to the plight of his parents and brother, all of whom are killed by Shishio's men for trying to report their atrocities to their village to the authorities. Kenshin beats Shishio's men, though his identity as Hitokiri Battōsai is revealed. Kenshin is taken to Shishio himself, the latter ordering Sōjiro to duel Kenshin, which ends with Sōjiro breaking Kenshin's sakabato. As he leaves the scene, Kenshin urges the villagers, including the orphaned boy, not to take their revenge against Shishio's men.

Arriving at Kyoto, Kenshin is asked by Misao, who is impressed by his words, to take shelter at an inn run by Kashiwazaki Nenji, actually a semi-retired ninja called Okina once employed by the Tokugawa shogunate known as the Oniwabanshu who were previously employed by the Tokugawa shogunate; Misao herself is also an aspiring ninja. Okina warns Kenshin that a lieutenant of his, Shinomori Aoshi (the one who beat Sanosuke previously), has made it his life goal to kill the strongest man in Japan - Kenshin.

Meanwhile, Kaoru decides to follow Kenshin to Kyoto, accompanied by Yahiko and Sanosuke. At the same time, Kenshin discovers to his dismay that the person who made his sakabato, Arai Shakku has died years before. His son, Seiku, initially refuses Kenshin's plea for another sakabato, but when Shishio's elite warrior, Sawagejō Chō, kidnaps his baby, Seiku asks Kenshin to defeat him. Seiku gives him a twin of the previous sakabato, which Kenshin uses to defeat Chō. By interrogating Chō, the government learns that Shishio plans to raze Kyoto to the ground that night. The government police, together with Kenshin, the  Oniwabanshu ninja, and the newly-arrived Kaoru, Yahiko, and Sanosuke, battle Shishio's men, while to prevent Aoshi from interfering Kenshin, Okina challenges his former pupil into a duel, which ends in his defeat. However, Kenshin realizes that Shishio's main goal is to set fire not to Kyoto, but Tokyo.

Kenshin discovers Shishio's ship about to set sail to the capital after learning that Sōjirō has kidnapped Kaoru. There, he has an inconclusive battle with Shishio, which ends when Kaoru is thrown off board. Kenshin jumps into the sea, but is unable to locate her. The film ends with a mysterious man finding Kenshin's unconscious body washed up on the beach and carries him away.

Cast

Principal cast list as presented on the Funimation Films website in Western name order:
 Takeru Satoh as Kenshin Himura
 Emi Takei as Kaoru Kamiya
 Munetaka Aoki as Sanosuke Sagara
 Yū Aoi as Megumi Takani
 Kaito Oyagi as Yahiko Myojin
 Yōsuke Eguchi as Hajime Saito
 Tatsuya Fujiwara as Makoto Shishio
 Ryunosuke Kamiki as Sojiro Seta
 Maryjun Takahashi as Yumi Komagata
 Ryosuke Miura as Cho Sawagejo
 Tao Tsuchiya as Misao Makimachi
 Min Tanaka as Okina
 Masaharu Fukuyama as Seijuro Hiko

Yūsuke Iseya makes his first appearance in the film series as Aoshi Shinomori.
Miyazawa Kazufumi as Ōkubo Toshimichi, one of historical Three Great Nobles of the Restoration

Production

The film was shot in a variety of locations around Japan, including Tokyo, Kyoto, Nagano, Ibaraki, and Kanagawa. Over 5000 extras were hired for the production, and filming wrapped on December 27, 2013.

For the Kyoto duology films, director Keishi Ōtomo said he did not have to put much advice to Takeru Satoh as his acting in the first film attracted multiple positive reactions by the staff and the audience. He then stated "Even without saying this or that from the side, he created an image of Kenshin, including his behavior, swordplay, and speech, through the necessary preparation and hard work. So I didn’t worry at all".

Due to the Kyoto films showing a darker characterization of Kenshin as he struggles against different strong rivals, Satoh also said his work became more challenging. Still, he found it interesting. A scene that Satoh enjoyed was Kenshin's fight against Sawagejō Chō due to the fact Kenshin is forced to attack his enemy even though he does not know his weapon is deadly which goes against his morals; as a result, Satoh briefly showed Kenshin's hitokiri side for a brief moment. The actor said he discussed this scene with the director who pleased with the result.

Release
The film was released on Blu-ray and DVD on December 17, 2014 in Japan.

The film was released on Blu-ray and DVD by Funimation on December 6, 2016 in North America which includes an English dubbed version of the film, with TV-MA rating.

Reception

Box office 

At the box office the movie earned a total of  internationally. The film also held the top spot at the box office in Japan during its first week. The film made its United States premiere at LA EigaFest 2014.

Critical reception 

The film received positive reviews from critics, with widespread praise regarding the film's action direction and fight choreography conducted by Kenji Tanigaki. Christopher O'Keeffe of TwitchFilm declared that the film "Delivers grand thrills" and "Satisfies with its mix of character drama and sword fights as it leads up to an intense battle on the streets of ancient Kyoto. By the time the sea-set finale roles around, everything is left in balance for what promises to be an epic ending to this thrilling tale." Marcus Goh of Yahoo! praised the film, stating that "Kyoto Inferno is a wonderfully executed adaptation that manages to wield together all the highlights of the manga and anime, while still fully utilising the film medium to tell its tale. Despite being the first part of a two-part sequel, it manages to be a self-sufficient, coherent story – not an easy feat for a two-part sequel."

Remy Van Ruiten praised the film, stating that "Rurouni Kenshin: Kyoto Inferno is a fantastic movie" and goes on to say "Even in the age of a high budget Marvel Cinematic Universe, Rurouni Kenshin: Kyoto Inferno is a very rare treat. As there aren’t as many of these movies being made based on anime of this caliber and the few that do get made avoiding sticking to the same formula, both overall and for the choreography during the battles, the experience still manages to feel fresh. Especially compared to the current comic book movies from the west recently. Not to knock them, but I’m definitely feeling comic book movie fatigue, and the very different cinematographic style of the Kenshin movies doesn’t make me feel the same way about them at all."

Mikhail Lecaros of GMA News Online stated "Ohtomo presents Kyoto Inferno with deliberate pacing, making the most of his now-extended runtime (Kyoto Inferno and The Legend Ends were filmed simultaneously), wisely giving the film moments to breathe. When the prerequisite sword fights and various punch-ups do show up, they are pitch-perfect live action extrapolations of the hand-drawn scenes that have enthralled fans for the past fifteen years."
Jahanzeb Khan of Snap Thirty awarded the film an "A" rating, and goes on to describe how "Kyoto Inferno does an excellent job of setting the scene for the epic conclusion that follows in The Legend Ends, and without this methodological build up the grand finale in the third film would not have the same weight to it at all. Kyoto Inferno does an apt job of establishing Shishio and his minions as a force to be reckoned with, a legitimate threat to the vulnerable Japanese society that is still struggling to transition into the Westernized values of the new government."

Accolades

Sequel

Music
One Ok Rock's song "Mighty Long Fall" from their seventh album, 35xxxv, is featured in the movie.

References

External links
 

2014 films
Funimation
2010s Japanese-language films
Japanese sequel films
Jidaigeki films
Live-action films based on manga
Rurouni Kenshin films
Samurai films
Warner Bros. films
Films directed by Keishi Ōtomo
Films shot in Kyoto Prefecture
Films shot in Tokyo
2010s historical adventure films
Historical action films
Films set in the 19th century
Films set in the Meiji period
Films scored by Naoki Satō
Japanese historical adventure films
2010s Japanese films